Dansville, New York may refer to:
 Dansville, Livingston County, New York, a village
 Dansville, Steuben County, New York, a town

See also
 North Dansville, New York, a town in Livingston County